Scopula thrasia is a moth of the  family Geometridae. It is found in Mexico.

References

Moths described in 1938
thrasia
Moths of Central America